Best Friend's Date is an American reality-drama television series. It aired on the Noggin channel as part of its nighttime programming block for teens, The N. In each episode, a teenager goes on a blind date with someone chosen by his or her best friend. The show was hosted by Tika Sumpter and Nick Slatkin. It was filmed from July to August 2004.

The show ran for one season of 12 episodes. It premiered on December 3, 2004, and aired its last episode on February 11, 2005. The show is notable for launching Tika Sumpter's career and for featuring an entire episode, "The Boys' Night Out Date," about a gay relationship. Most episodes featured groups of teenage friends from Los Angeles, while the final two episodes included guest appearances by Drake, Ali Mukaddam, and Stacey Farber.

Format
The show is based on the premise that people's best friends probably know them better than they know themselves. Each episode has a teenager's best friend screen and select their perfect blind date. Their compatibility is tested as cameras accompany each date to find out whether the result is "magic or tragic." Roger Catlin of the Hartford Courant likened the show's format to a "less perverse" version of Date My Mom.

The episodes start with a best friend selecting a date for their friend from a pool of four candidates. After they put each prospective date through rounds of interviews and challenges, the choice is made. Next, the best friend introduces their choice to their friend and their friend's parents. The young provisional couple must then cope with first date jitters and a variety of surprise curveballs that the show throws at them, like singing karaoke on street corners or bowling while handcuffed together. Each date ends with a deciding moment where each dater must decide whether it is a budding romance, a mutual "no thanks," or a heartbreaking rejection.

History
Noggin LLC first trademarked the show's name and format on June 15, 2004. The show was officially announced to be greenlit by The Hollywood Reporter on July 13, 2004. It was shot on location in Los Angeles from July 24, 2004, through the end of August. The first episode premiered on December 3, 2004, and new episodes aired until February 11, 2005. The soundtrack for the show was composed by Derek McKeith.

The first ten episodes are self-contained stories, and the last two episodes make up an hour-long special. The special expands on the usual format by holding two dates (a double date) involving two celebrities: Drake (Aubrey Graham) and Ali Mukaddam. The finale aired on February 11, 2005, at 9:30 PM. An encore showing was played on February 13. A week before the finale aired, Multichannel News listed Best Friend's Date as one of the shows that helped to increase Noggin's ratings during its The N block by 15% by the end of 2004.

Cast
Tika Sumpter
Nick Slatkin

Episodes
Noggin aired the episodes slightly out of production order. It featured an episode guide on its The N website.

References

External links
 
 Best Friend's Date on TV Guide

2000s American reality television series
2004 American television series debuts
2005 American television series endings
Noggin (brand) original programming
Dating and relationship reality television series
English-language television shows
Television series about teenagers